Tai Yuen Estate is a public housing estate in Tai Po, New Territories, Hong Kong. It is the first public housing estate in Tai Po, located at the town centre of Tai Po New Town. It is built on the reclaimed land of Tai Po Hoi, the estate consists of 7 residential blocks completed in 1980.

Ting Nga Court is a Home Ownership Scheme court in Tai Po, near Tai Yuen Estate. It consists of three residential buildings built in 1981.

Houses

Tai Yuen Estate

Ting Nga Court

Demographics
According to the 2016 by-census, Tai Yuen Estate had a population of 14,464. The median age was 46.7 and the majority of residents (98.4 per cent) were of Chinese ethnicity. The average household size was 2.9 people. The median monthly household income of all households (i.e. including both economically active and inactive households) was HK$20,000.

Politics
For the 2019 District Council election, the estate fell within two constituencies. Tai Yuen Estate is located in the Tai Yuen constituency, which is currently represented by Au Chun-ho, while Ting Nga Court falls within the Chung Ting constituency, which was formerly represented by Man Nim-chi until July 2021.

See also

Public housing estates in Tai Po

References

Residential buildings completed in 1980
Public housing estates in Hong Kong
Tai Po
Housing estates with centralized LPG system in Hong Kong